Bruno Mauro Nunes da Silva (born 3 October 1973), more commonly known as Bruno Mauro or just Mauro, is a retired Angolan professional football player who played mainly as a winger. Mauro was a journeyman who played in various teams in Portugal, as well as Cyprus and Greece.

Career
Mauro is the son of Portugal international footballer Laurindo, who spent most of his career with Belenenses. He was born in Portugal, but moved to Angola at the age of four with his family. He studied electrical engineering for a year before committing himself to football, returning to Portugal to jumpstart his career. He is noted for scoring a hattrick against Sporting on 16 September 2002, ending their 28-game win streak.

International career
Mauro was born in Portugal to Angolan parents. He played for the Angola national football team.

References

External links
Mauro ForaDeJogo Profile
Mauro ZeroZero Profile
NFT Profile

1973 births
Living people
Footballers from Lisbon
Angolan footballers
Angola international footballers
Portuguese footballers
Portuguese sportspeople of Angolan descent
Association football wingers
Association football forwards
Primeira Liga players
Segunda Divisão players
Académico de Viseu F.C. players
Associação Naval 1º de Maio players
S.C. Farense players
S.C. Lamego players
S.C. Covilhã players
S.C.U. Torreense players
S.C. Lusitânia players
F.C. Penafiel players
F.C. Paços de Ferreira players
C.F. Os Belenenses players
C.F. Estrela da Amadora players
C.D. Santa Clara players
A.D. Ovarense players
Acharnaikos F.C. players
Onisilos Sotira players
Football League (Greece) players
Cypriot Second Division players
Expatriate footballers in Greece
Expatriate footballers in Cyprus
Angolan expatriate footballers
Angolan expatriate sportspeople in Greece
Angolan expatriate sportspeople in Cyprus